Gowar is an extinct indigenous language of Australia. The language was spoken on Moreton Island off the coast of modern-day Brisbane.

Other spellings are Goowar, Gooar, Guar, Gowr-burra; other names Ngugi (Mugee, Wogee, Gnoogee), Chunchiburri, Booroo-geen-merrie.

It may be related to the Durubalic languages (Bowern 2011) or (along with the Pimpama language) to the Bandjalangic languages (Jefferies 2011).

References

Durubalic languages
Extinct languages of Queensland
Yugambeh–Bundjalung languages